White Oak Creek may refer to:

White Oak Creek (Georgia), a stream in Coweta County, Georgia
White Oak Creek (Greenup County, Kentucky), a creek in Russell, Kentucky
White Oak Creek (Sampson Creek tributary), a stream in Missouri
White Oak Creek (Spring River tributary), a stream in Missouri
White Oak Creek (New Hope River tributary), a stream in Chatham and Wake Counties, North Carolina
White Oak Creek (Brown County, Ohio), a stream
White Oak Creek (South Carolina)
White Oak Creek (Tennessee), a tributary of the Tennessee River
White Oak Creek (Sulphur River tributary) a stream in Texas
White Oak Creek (Banister River tributary), a stream in Pittsylvania, Virginia